Metropolis is the long-awaited sixth studio album released by British AOR/hard rock band FM, their first since 1995.  FM reformed in 2007 to headline Firefest IV, and following Andy Barnett's subsequent departure, FM recruited new guitarist Jim Kirkpatrick in time to once again headline Firefest in October 2009 and record the new album.  Metropolis was produced by the band and recorded at various studios including world-renowned Metropolis Studios in London (providing the band with the inspiration for the album title itself), where famous clients include Queen and more recently The Who and The Black Eyed Peas.

Metropolis was released 29 March 2010 by Riff City Records in the UK and on the AOR Heaven label in Europe, with tracks from the album gaining airplay on many significant radio stations, including a coveted place on the BBC Radio 2 playlist.

Track listing 
 "Wildside" (Overland, Jupp, Goldsworthy, Kirkpatrick) - 4:57
 "Hollow" (Overland, Kirkpatrick) - 4:05
 "Unbreakable" (Overland, Jupp, Goldsworthy) - 5:23
 "Flamingo Road" (Overland, Jupp, Goldsworthy) - 5:04
 "Metropolis" (Overland, Jupp, Goldsworthy, Kirkpatrick) - 1:35
 "Over You" (Overland, Jupp, Goldsworthy) - 4:36
 "Days Gone By" (Overland, Jupp, Goldsworthy) - 5:43
 "Bring Back Yesterday" (Overland, Jupp, Goldsworthy) - 5:37
 "I Ain't The One" (Overland, Jupp, Goldsworthy) - 4:51
 "Don't Need Nothin'" (Overland, Jupp, Goldsworthy) - 4:24
 "The Extra Mile" (Overland, Jupp, Goldsworthy, Morris) - 4:42
 "Who'll Stop The Rain" (Overland, Jupp, Goldsworthy) - 5:24
 "Still The Fight Goes On" (Overland, Jupp, Goldsworthy) - 7:11
 "Kissed By An Angel" (Overland, Jupp, Goldsworthy) - 5:31 (Japan Bonus Track)

Personnel 
 Steve Overland - lead vocals, rhythm guitar
 Merv Goldsworthy - bass, backing vocals
 Pete Jupp - drums, backing vocals
 Jem Davis - keyboards, backing vocals, harmonica
 Jim Kirkpatrick - lead guitar, backing vocals

Production 
 Produced by FM
 Mixed by Jeff Knowler, Pete Jupp
 Engineered by Matt Lawrence, James Ridley and Chris D'Adda
 Recorded at Metropolis Studios (London), Sonic Wizadry Studios (London) and Vale Studios (Worcestershire)

References 

FM (British band) albums
2010 albums